Anisothrix is a genus of snout moths. It was described by Émile Louis Ragonot in 1891.

Species
Anisothrix adustalis Ragonot, 1891
Anisothrix agamalis (Hampson, 1906)
Anisothrix grenadensis Schaus, 1904

References

Chrysauginae
Pyralidae genera
Taxa named by Émile Louis Ragonot